Dimitrios Paraskevas is a Greek-American Professional Basketball Player

He is a

References

External links
 http://basket.gr
 http://www.pressofatlanticcity.com/mobi/hssports/basketball/article_840c5ba7-901d-55d8-8504-a6e4d8ae302e.html
 http://www.vineland.org/pages/Vineland_Public_Schools/News/157_student_athletes_honored_a

1995 births
Living people
Basketball players from New Jersey
American people of Greek descent
Point guards
American men's basketball players